Ajvar (Cyrillic script: Ajвар, Aйвар) is a condiment made principally from sweet bell peppers and eggplants. The relish became a popular side dish throughout Yugoslavia after World War II and is popular in Southeast Europe.

Homemade ajvar is made of roasted peppers. Depending on the capsaicin content in bell peppers and the amount of added chili peppers, it can be sweet (traditional), piquant (the most common), or very hot. Ajvar can be consumed as a bread spread or as a side dish. Ajvar has a few variations. One variation contains tomato and eggplant. Another is made with green bell peppers and oregano.

"Homemade Leskovac Ajvar" and "Macedonian Ajvar" are registered with the World Intellectual Property Organization in order to protect their brand names.

Etymology and origin
The name ajvar comes from the Turkish word havyar, which means "salted roe, caviar" and shares an etymology with "caviar", coming from the Persian word "xaviyar". Before the 20th century, significant local production of caviar occurred on the Danube, with sturgeon swimming from the Black Sea up to Belgrade. Domestic ajvar, meaning "caviar,” used to be a very popular dish in Belgrade homes and restaurants, but the domestic production of caviar became unsteady in the 1890s because of labor disputes. Eventually a special pepper salad was offered as a substitute in Belgrade restaurants under the name "red ajvar" (crveni ajvar) or "Serbian ajvar" (srpski ajvar).

Preparation

Homemade ajvar is made of roasted, minced, and then cooked peppers, while some industrial producers use fresh minced peppers, cooked with sunflower oil afterwards, which leads to a lower quality. Ajvar preparation is somewhat difficult, because it requires considerable manual labour, particularly for peeling the roasted peppers. Traditionally, people prepare it in mid-autumn, when bell peppers are most abundant, and preserve it in glass jars for consumption throughout the year. Anecdotally, most households' stocks do not last until the spring, when fresh vegetables become available, so it is usually enjoyed as a winter food. Often, the whole family or neighbours gather to prepare the bell peppers. The principal cultivar of pepper used is called roga (i.e. "horned"). Roga is large, red, horn-shaped, with thick flesh and relatively easy to peel. It typically ripens in late September.

To produce ajvar, bell peppers are roasted whole on a plate on an open fire, a plate of wood in a stove, or in an oven. The baked peppers must briefly cool to allow the flesh to separate from the skin. Next, the skin is carefully peeled off and the seeds are removed. The peppers are then ground in a mill or chopped into tiny pieces (this variant is often referred to as pindjur). Finally, the resulting mush is stewed for several hours in large pots. Sunflower oil is added at this stage to condense and reduce the water, and to enhance later preservation. Salt (and sometimes vinegar) is added at the end and the hot mush is poured directly into sterilized glass jars, which are sealed immediately.

Production

Ajvar is produced in most Balkan countries, including Bosnia, Croatia, North Macedonia, Albania, Slovenia  and Serbia. Serbia's reported annual production is 640 tons.

Ajvar is one of the so-called zimnica (winter foods), which include pickled chili peppers, pickled tomatoes, and anything else that can be preserved in a jar just before winter.

See also
 , a similar relish in Bulgarian, Macedonian, and Serbian cuisines
 , a similar relish in Bosnian, Macedonian, and Serbian cuisines
 , a similar relish in Romanian cuisine
 , an eggplant-based relish in Bulgarian and Turkish cuisines
 Malidzano, a similar relish in Macedonian cuisine
 , a Turkish paste made from red peppers alone
 , a similar Hungarian (also made in parts of Slovakia and Serbia) stewed red pepper, onion, and garlic dish
 
 , a similar relish of Indo-European origin in South Asian cuisines

References

External links
 (article and recipe)

Albanian cuisine
Bosnia and Herzegovina cuisine
Bulgarian cuisine
Chili pepper dishes
Condiments
Croatian cuisine
Eggplant dishes
Macedonian cuisine
Montenegrin cuisine
Serbian cuisine
Spreads (food)